Connor Hall in Santa Fe, New Mexico is a Pueblo Revival-style building which was constructed in 1927 and 1928. Located at 1060 Cerrillos Rd., New Mexico School for the Deaf, it was listed on the National Register of Historic Places in 1988.

It was designed by architect George Williamson as an L-shaped building to serve as a dormitory. It is a three-story masonry and stucco building. It has "with irregular stepped massing, recessed fenestration, a flat roof and rounded parapets," and a recessed entryway "under a buttressed mission-like arch." Its bricks were made at the New Mexico State Penitentiary in Santa Fe.

The building was expanded to the rear in 1956 and 1957. It underwent a complete renovation in 1978 to plans by architect Charles Nolan.

The building was in use as a dormitory in 1987.

References

External links

National Register of Historic Places in Santa Fe, New Mexico
Pueblo Revival architecture in Santa Fe, New Mexico
Traditional Native American dwellings
Buildings and structures completed in 1927
Santa Fe County, New Mexico
Native American history of New Mexico